The Flintstones is a comic book series based on the 1960-1966 animated sitcom created by Hanna-Barbera. The series was published by DC Comics as part of the Hanna-Barbera Beyond comic book initiative. The 12-issue limited series was written by Mark Russell and drawn by Steve Pugh, with the first issue published June 6, 2016, and the twelfth and final issue published June 7, 2017.

Main characters
 Fred Flintstone
 Wilma Flintstone
 Barney Rubble
 Betty Rubble
 Pebbles Flintstone
 Bamm-Bamm Rubble

Recurring characters
 George Slate
 Reverend Tom
 The Great Gazoo
 Professor Carl Sargon
 Clod the Destroyer
 Vacuum Cleaner and Bowling Ball
 Stony Danza
 Thorstone Pebblen

Crossover
The Flintstones crossed over with Booster Gold in Booster Gold/The Flintstones Annual #1 on March 29, 2017.

Reception
The Flintstones comic has received mostly positive critical reviews.

See also
 The Flintstones
 Hanna-Barbera Beyond

References

Comics based on television series
DC Comics titles
Humor comics
Satirical comics
2016 comics debuts
2017 comics endings
The Flintstones
Hanna-Barbera comics
Comic book reboots
Comics set in prehistory
Comics about extraterrestrial life